The Delaware Valley, sometimes referred to as Greater Philadelphia or the Philadelphia metropolitan area, is a metropolitan region in the Northeast on the East Coast of the United States that centers on Philadelphia and spans four U.S. states: Southeastern Pennsylvania, southern New Jersey, northern Delaware, and the northern Eastern Shore of Maryland. According to the 2020 census, the core metropolitan statistical area of the Delaware Valley had a total population of 6.288 million, making it the nation's seventh largest and world's 35th largest metropolitan area, while the combined statistical area of the Delaware Valley contains a total population of 7.366 million.

The Delaware Valley's urban core is Philadelphia, the nation's sixth-most populous city. Other major urban population centers in the region include Reading, Upper Darby Township, and Chester in Pennsylvania; Atlantic City, Camden, Vineland, and Cherry Hill in New Jersey; and Wilmington and Dover in Delaware. The Philadelphia metropolitan area has a gross domestic product of $431 billion, the ninth-largest among U.S. metropolitan areas.

The Delaware Valley has been influential in U.S. history and industry. The area has been home to many people and sites significant to American culture, history, and politics. Philadelphia is sometimes known as "The Birthplace of America", since both the Declaration of Independence and the Constitution were drafted and signed in the city. The Delaware Valley was home to many other instrumental moments during the American Revolution, and Philadelphia served as the nation's first capital for most of the 18th century until construction of the nation's capital in Washington, D.C. in 1800. Both the Declaration of Independence and U.S. Constitution were signed and ratified in Independence Hall in Philadelphia in 1776 and 1789, respectively.

The Delaware Valley is one of the nation's leading regions for academia and academic research with a considerable number of globally-known and highly ranked universities, including the University of Pennsylvania (an Ivy League university that ranks among the world's top), Drexel University, Thomas Jefferson University, Rowan University, Villanova University, Saint Joseph's University, Temple University, Rutgers University–Camden, La Salle University, the University of Delaware, Stockton University, and others.  Philadelphia and the Delaware Valley have become a biotechnology and venture capital hub. In addition, South Jersey and the wider Philadelphia metropolitan area have become a U.S. East Coast epicenter for logistics and warehouse construction.

Geography

The Delaware Valley is geographically associated and proximate to the Delaware River's main watershed, which encompass the Delaware River's three primary tributaries, the Schuylkill River, Lehigh River, and the Brandywine River, and their respective valleys and sub-basins. These extensions also apply culturally because the ease of land travel in the region affords a great deal of daily interaction, creating a regional culture and value structure that largely blends and is parallel throughout it.

U.S. government agencies have reached various definitions of the Delaware Valley and the Greater Philadelphia Area.

The Office of Management and Budget (OMB) defines metropolitan statistical area (MSAs), which are regions with relatively high population densities at their cores and close economic ties throughout their respective areas. MSAs are further combined into combined statistical areas (CSAs), reflecting commuting patterns. Neither is a formal administrative division.

Metropolitan statistical area (MSA)

Philadelphia is located in the Philadelphia-Camden-Wilmington Metropolitan Statistical Area, which includes:
 Camden, NJ Metropolitan Division
 Burlington County
 Camden County
 Gloucester County
 Montgomery County-Bucks County-Chester County, PA Metropolitan Division
 Bucks County
 Chester County
 Montgomery County
 Philadelphia, PA Metropolitan Division
 Delaware County
 Philadelphia County
 Wilmington, DE-MD-NJ Metropolitan Division
 New Castle County, Delaware
 Cecil County, Maryland
 Salem County, New Jersey

Combined statistical area (CSA)
The Philadelphia-Reading-Camden Combined Statistical Area includes:
 The Philadelphia-Camden-Wilmington MSA (eleven counties, as defined above)
 Berks County, Pennsylvania, comprising the Reading, PA MSA
 Kent County, Delaware, comprising the Dover, DE MSA
 Atlantic County, New Jersey, comprising the Atlantic City-Hammonton, NJ MSA
 Cape May County, New Jersey, comprising the Ocean City, NJ MSA
 Cumberland County, New Jersey, comprising the Vineland-Bridgeton, NJ MSA

Regional Planning Commission
The Delaware Valley Regional Planning Commission (DVRPC) serves all of the counties of the MSA above, except for the counties in the Wilmington, DE-MD-NJ Metropolitan Division. However the DVRPC does include, additionally, Mercer County, New Jersey, which the OMB classifies as the Trenton-Princeton, NJ MSA, part of the larger New York-Newark CSA.

Population and economy

According to 2016 estimates from the U.S. Census Bureau, the Philadelphia-Camden-Wilmington Metropolitan Statistical Area ranks as the seventh-largest MSA in the U.S. with 6,070,500 people. According to the Bureau of Economic Analysis, the Philadelphia-Camden-Wilmington MSA had a gross domestic product of $431 billion, the ninth-largest among U.S. metropolitan areas. 2016 Census Bureau estimates rank the Philadelphia-Reading-Camden Combined Statistical Area as the ninth-largest CSA in the U.S., with 7,179,357 people.

The Philadelphia-Camden-Wilmington Metropolitan Statistical Area's population of roughly 6 million people is comparable to that of countries such as Lebanon, Denmark, and Nicaragua. The MSA's nominal gross domestic product of $431 billion is comparable to countries such as Belgium, Iran, and Thailand. The MSA also ranks as the second most populous in the Northeastern U.S. after the New York metropolitan area, while the CSA is third-largest in the Northeast after the New York and Boston metropolitan areas. The Baltimore–Washington metropolitan area, which is part of Northeast Megalopolis but is considered part of the Southeastern U.S. under Census Bureau definitions, is also larger than the Philadelphia metropolitan area. Philadelphia itself is the sixth-most populous city in the U.S. and the third-most populous U.S. city east of the Mississippi River, after New York City and Chicago.

At least two educational institutions, Delaware Valley Regional High School in Alexandria Township and Delaware Valley College in Doylestown Township, and a now defunct local newspaper, The Delaware Valley News in 
Frenchtown, are named for the region.

Subregions

Sixteen counties in four states constitute the Philadelphia-Reading-Camden Combined Statistical Area. The five Pennsylvania counties in the Metropolitan Statistical Area are collectively known as Southeastern Pennsylvania, and the four suburban counties from this region are sometimes called the "collar counties." Aside from Philadelphia, major municipalities in Southeastern Pennsylvania include the inner suburbs of Upper Darby Township and Bensalem Township. Berks County, which forms its own MSA and contains the CSA's second largest city, Reading, is generally not considered to be part of Southeastern Pennsylvania and is sometimes assigned to South Central Pennsylvania.

The seven New Jersey counties in the CSA form South Jersey, although Ocean County, which is part of the New York CSA, is also sometimes considered to be part of South Jersey. Atlantic County, Cape May County, and Cumberland County each form their own respective metropolitan statistical areas. Atlantic City, Cape May County, and the southern Jersey Shore, including Margate City, Ventnor City, the Wildwoods, and Sea Isle City, are major tourist destinations for people from inside and outside of the Delaware Valley. Other major municipalities in South Jersey include Cherry Hill and Camden, which is across the Delaware River, east of Philadelphia.

The two counties of Delaware in the CSA constitute a majority of Delaware's land mass and population. Wilmington is the most populous city in Delaware and the fifth-most populous municipality in the Delaware Valley. The lone Maryland county in the Philadelphia-Reading-Camden Combined Statistical Area is part of the region known as the Eastern Shore of Maryland.

Media market
The Delaware Valley and several areas bordering up on it, including the Lehigh Valley, are part of the Philadelphia media market, the fourth-largest media market in the nation as of 2023.

Components of Philadelphia-Camden-Wilmington, PA-NJ-DE-MD Metropolitan Statistical Area

Additional Components of Philadelphia-Camden-Vineland, PA-NJ-DE-MD Combined Statistical Area

List of largest municipalities

The following municipalities are all within the Philadelphia-Reading-Camden combined statistical area and part of the Delaware Valley:

Statistical history
When metropolitan areas were originally defined in 1950, most of the area now in the Delaware Valley was split between four metropolitan areas, or "standard metropolitan areas," as they were called. The Philadelphia SMA comprised Philadelphia, Bucks, Chester, Delaware and Montgomery counties in Pennsylvania and Burlington, Camden and Gloucester counties in New Jersey. The Wilmington SMA comprised New Castle County in Delaware and Salem County in New Jersey, while Berks County was the Reading SMA and Atlantic County was the Atlantic City SMA.

In 1960, Cecil County was added to what was now the Wilmington Standard Metropolitan Statistical Area (SMSA). In 1980, Cumberland County was defined as the Vineland-Millville-Bridgeton SMSA.

In 1990, the Philadelphia, Wilmington and Vineland-Millville-Bridgeton SMSAs were merged with the Trenton SMSA as the Philadelphia-Wilmington-Trenton Consolidated Metropolitan Statistical Area. At the same time, Cape May County was added to the Atlantic City SMSA.  "Philadelphia-Wilmington-Trenton" became obsolete one census later, with Trenton moving to the New York-Newark-Bridgeport CSA, and the Philadelphia-Wilmington-Vineland CSA consisting only of the Philadelphia-Wilmington-Camden MSA and the Vineland-Millville-Bridgeton MSA.  Kent County became the Dover MSA in 2000, and it and Atlantic City were added to the Philadelphia CSA in 2010, for a total of six MSA components;  as a result of new 2010 definitions based on a threshold of 15% labor interchange between MSAs, two more MSAs were added to the CSA, for a total of six.  With Ocean City, NJ, and Reading, PA, the CSA is now known as Philadelphia-Reading-Camden.

Characteristics

The Delaware Valley is home to extensive populations of Irish Americans, German Americans, English Americans, Ukrainian Americans, Italian Americans, Swedish-Americans, who have a museum located at FDR Park in South Philadelphia, Polish Americans, Scottish Americans, Ulster Scot or "Scotch-Irish" Americans, Welsh Americans, Jewish Americans, Greek Americans, African Americans, Chinese Americans, Indian Americans, Russian Americans, Korean Americans, Vietnamese Americans, Armenian Americans, Arab Americans, Turkish Americans, Pakistani Americans, Israeli Americans, various African immigrant groups, particularly from West Africa, including Nigerian Americans, Ghanaian Americans, and Sierra Leonean Americans, as well as East African immigrants, such as Ethiopian Americans; various West Indian American groups, including Jamaican Americans and Haitian Americans; and various Hispanic American groups. Within the Hispanic population, the vast majority are Puerto Ricans, though other significant groups include Dominican Americans, Mexican Americans, and populations from Central America. There is even a small Native American community known as Lenapehoking for Lenni-Lenape Indians of West Philadelphia.

Philadelphia's suburbs contain a high concentration of malls, the two largest of which have at least  of office space, and at least  of retail. These are the King of Prussia mall in King of Prussia, Pennsylvania, which is the largest in the U.S. (leasable sq. feet of retail space), and the Cherry Hill Mall in Cherry Hill, New Jersey, which was the first enclosed mall on the East Coast. In addition, the Christiana Mall in Newark, Delaware, is a popular destination due to its proximity to Interstate 95 and because of the availability of tax-free shopping in Delaware. Malls, office complexes, strip shopping plazas, expressways, and tract housing are common sights, and more and more continue to replace rolling countryside, farms, woods, and wetlands. However, due to strong opposition by residents and political officials, many acres of land have been preserved throughout the Delaware Valley. Older townships and large boroughs such as Cheltenham, Norristown, Jenkintown, Upper Darby and West Chester retain distinct community identities while engulfed in suburbia. The fastest-growing counties are Chester, Montgomery, Bucks, and Gloucester.

Mid-Atlantic American English and its subset, Philadelphia English, are two common dialects of American English in Philadelphia and the Delaware Valley.

Climate
The Delaware Valley has four distinct seasons with ample precipitation and is divided by the 0 °C (32 °F) January isotherm. Philadelphia and the New Jersey portion of the area, almost all of the Delaware and Maryland portions, most of Delaware County and lower Bucks County, lowland southern Chester County, and some southern and lowland areas of Montgomery County have a humid subtropical climate (Cfa according to the Köppen climate classification.) The remainder of the Delaware Valley has a hot-summer humid continental climate (Dfa.) PRISM Climate Group at Oregon State University Snow amounts may vary widely year-to-year and normally do vary widely within the Delaware Valley.

The region has only two ski areas: Bear Creek Mountain Resort in Longswamp Township, Berks County and Spring Mountain Adventures in central Montgomery County. Global warming endangers skiing at the latter, where the climate narrowly remains Dfa and the owners have diversified to year-round activities.

Using the -3 °C January isotherm as a boundary, all of the Delaware Valley is humid subtropical except for higher portions of Berks County. The warm-summer humid continental climate (Dfb) only exists in higher areas of Berks where all monthly temperatures average below 22 °C. The hardiness zone in the region ranges from 6a in higher areas of Berks to 8a in parts of Atlantic City and Cape May.

Using the Trewartha climate classification system, which requires eight months to average at least 50 °F for the climate to be considered subtropical, the region only has seven such months, so the areas considered Cfa by Köppen are oceanic (Do) in the Trewartha system.

Colonial history

The valley was the territory of the Susquehannock and Lenape, who are recalled in place names throughout the region. The region became part of the Dutch colony of New Netherland after the exploration of Delaware Bay in 1609. The Dutch called the Delaware River the Zuyd Rivier, or South River, and considered the lands along it banks and those of its bay to be the southern flank of its province of New Netherland. In 1638, it began to be settled by Swedes, Forest Finns, Dutch, and Walloons and became the colony of New Sweden, though this was not officially recognized by the Dutch Empire which re-asserted control in 1655. The area was taken by the English in 1664.
The name Delaware comes from Thomas West, 3rd Baron De La Warr, who had arrived at Jamestown, Virginia in 1610, just as original settlers were about to abandon it, and thus maintaining the English foothold on the North American continent. In the early 1700s, Huguenot refugees from France by way of Germany and then England began settling in the Delaware River Valley. Specifically, they left their mark in Hunterdon County, New Jersey (Frenchtown) and Bethlehem, Pennsylvania.

Transportation

Many residents commute to jobs and travel in Philadelphia, Camden, Wilmington, and the surrounding suburbs with the help of expressways, trains, and buses. There are currently no transit connections to Reading, the second largest municipality in the region.

Rail

Rapid transit 

 SEPTA
 Market–Frankford Line connecting 69th Street Transportation Center in Upper Darby to Frankford Transportation Center in Near Northeast Philadelphia, passing through Center City
 Broad Street Line connecting Fern Rock Transportation Center in North Philadelphia to Center City and NRG station in South Philadelphia
 Norristown High Speed Line connecting 69th Street Transportation Center with Norristown Transportation Center in Norristown
 PATCO
 PATCO Speedline connecting Philadelphia to Lindenwold, NJ in Camden County with connections to NJT's Atlantic City Line.

Light rail 
 SEPTA
 Subway–surface lines: Routes 10, 11, 13, 34, and 36, connecting West Philadelphia and Delaware County with 13th Street Station, running at street-level through Delaware County and West Philadelphia, and beneath Market Street in Center City
 Route 15 along Girard Avenue from 63rd Street and Girard Avenue to Richmond and Westmoreland Streets
 Routes 101 and 102 connecting Media (Route 101) and Sharon Hill (Route 102) in Delaware County with 69th Street Transportation Center
 NJ Transit
 River Line connecting Camden, New Jersey to Trenton, New Jersey, running along the east bank of the Delaware River.

Commuter rail

 SEPTA Regional Rail
 Airport Line connecting Central Philadelphia with Philadelphia International Airport in Philadelphia and Delaware Counties.
 Wilmington/Newark Line connecting Philadelphia to the Wilmington, Delaware area (with limited weekday service to Newark, Delaware), via Chester City and Delaware County.
 Warminster Line connecting Philadelphia with southeastern Montgomery County and Warminster in Bucks County.
 West Trenton Line connecting Philadelphia north to the Trenton, New Jersey area, serving Montgomery and Bucks County, Pennsylvania, between Jenkintown and Yardley, Pennsylvania, with the final stop in Ewing, New Jersey.
 Media/Wawa Line connecting Philadelphia to central Delaware County.
 Paoli/Thorndale Line connecting Philadelphia with the affluent Main Line area and western Chester County near Coatesville.
 Lansdale/Doylestown Line connecting Philadelphia with Lansdale in central Montgomery County and Doylestown in Bucks County.
 Manayunk/Norristown Line connecting Philadelphia with Conshohocken and Norristown in Montgomery County.
 Cynwyd Line connecting Philadelphia with Bala Cynwyd on the Philadelphia/Montgomery County line (limited weekday service)
 Trenton Line connecting Philadelphia to Trenton, New Jersey, serving Bucks County.
 Fox Chase Line connecting Central Philadelphia with the Fox Chase area in Philadelphia.
 Chestnut Hill East Line and Chestnut Hill West Line connecting Central Philadelphia with the Chestnut Hill area of the city.
 NJ Transit
 Atlantic City Line connecting Philadelphia to Atlantic City, New Jersey with connections to PATCO Speedline in Lindenwold, New Jersey.
 MARC Train
 Penn Line connecting Perryville, Maryland to Baltimore and Washington D.C., and in the future will connect to SEPTA at Newark, DE.

Intercity rail
 Amtrak
Acela: high-speed rail connecting Washington, D.C. with Boston 
Cardinal connecting Chicago with New York City
Carolinian connecting Charlotte, NC with New York City
Crescent connecting New Orleans and New York City
Keystone Service connecting Harrisburg, PA with New York City
Northeast Regional: inter-city regional rail service from Virginia to Boston
Palmetto connecting Savannah, GA with New York City
Pennsylvanian connecting Pittsburgh with New York City
Silver Meteor connecting Miami with New York City
Silver Star connecting Miami with New York City
Vermonter connecting Washington, D.C. with St. Albans, VT

Bus service

Transit buses 
 SEPTA
 NJ Transit
 South Jersey Transportation Authority
 DART First State
 Krapf Transit
Bucks County Transport
 Transportation Management Association of Chester County
 TMA Bucks
 Pottstown Area Rapid Transit
 Berks Area Regional Transportation Authority
 Cecil Transit
 Atlantic City casino bus routes by a number of private carriers

Intercity bus 

 Amtrak Thruway Motorcoach
 BoltBus
 Greyhound Lines
 Klein Transportation
 Martz Trailways
 Megabus
 OurBus
 Peter Pan Bus Lines
 Trans-Bridge Lines

Major highways

Pennsylvania
 
 
 
 
 
 
 
 
 
 
 
 
 
 
 
 
 
 
 
 
 
 
 
 
 
 
 
 
 
 
 
 
 
 
 
 
 
 
 
 
 
 
 
 
 
 
 
 
 
 
 
 
 
 
 
 
 
 
 
 
 
 
 
 
 
 
 
 
 
 
 
 
 
 
 

New Jersey
 
 
 
 
 
 
 
 
 
 
 
 
 
 
 
 
 
 
 
 
 
 
 
 
 
 
 
 
 
 
 
 
 
 
 
 
 
 
 
 
 
 
 
 
 
 

Delaware
 
 
 
 
 
 
 
 
 
 
 
 
 
 
 
 
 
 
 
 
 
 
 
 
 
 
 
 
 
 
 
 
 

Maryland
 
 
 
 

Delaware River Bridges

 New Hope–Lambertville Toll Bridge
 Scudder Falls Bridge
 Delaware River – Turnpike Toll Bridge
 Burlington–Bristol Bridge
 Tacony–Palmyra Bridge
 Betsy Ross Bridge
 Benjamin Franklin Bridge
 Walt Whitman Bridge
 Commodore Barry Bridge
 Delaware Memorial Bridge

Airports

Major:
 Philadelphia International Airport (PHL), located 15 miles southwest of Center City Philadelphia, is the main international airport serving the Delaware Valley
 Newark Liberty International Airport (EWR), while not in the Delaware Valley, is a major airport serving certain regions of the Delaware Valley, including Bucks and Montgomery Counties in Southeast Pennsylvania, Philadelphia, and New Jersey.

Secondary:
 Atlantic City International Airport (ACY)
 Lehigh Valley International Airport (ABE) (not in CSA)
 New Castle Airport (ILG)
 Northeast Philadelphia Airport (PNE)
 Reading Regional Airport (RDG)
 Trenton–Mercer Airport (TTN) (not in CSA)

Ferry
The Cape May–Lewes Ferry crosses the mouth of the Delaware Bay between Cape May County, New Jersey and Sussex County, Delaware; U.S. Route 9 uses this ferry.

Colleges and universities

Delaware
 Delaware College of Art and Design
 Delaware State University
 Goldey-Beacom College
 University of Delaware
 Wesley College
 Widener University School of Law
 Wilmington University

Maryland 

 Cecil College

New Jersey
 Rider University
 Rowan University
 Rutgers School of Law–Camden
 Rutgers University (Camden)
 Stockton University
 The College of New Jersey

Pennsylvania

 Albright College
 Alvernia University
 Arcadia University
 Bryn Mawr College
 Cabrini College
 Cairn University
 Chestnut Hill College
 Cheyney University of Pennsylvania
 Curtis Institute of Music
 Delaware Valley University
 DeVry University
 Drexel University
 Eastern University
 Gwynedd-Mercy College
 Harcum College
 Haverford College
 Holy Family University
 Immaculata University
 Kutztown University of Pennsylvania
 La Salle University
 Lincoln University
 Manor College
 Moore College of Art and Design
 Neumann University
 Peirce College
 Penn State Abington
 Penn State Berks
 Penn State Brandywine
 Penn State Great Valley
 Philadelphia College of Osteopathic Medicine
 Point Park University
 Rosemont College
 Saint Joseph's University
 Swarthmore College
 Temple University
 Thomas Jefferson University
 University of Pennsylvania
 University of the Arts (Philadelphia)
 University of the Sciences in Philadelphia
 Ursinus College
 Valley Forge Christian College
 Valley Forge Military Academy and College
 Villanova University
 West Chester University
 Westminster Theological Seminary
 Widener University

Culture

Sports teams

Listing of the professional sports teams in the Delaware Valley
 National Basketball Association (NBA)
 Philadelphia 76ers
 Major League Baseball (MLB)
 Philadelphia Phillies
 Minor League Baseball (MiLB)
 Jersey Shore BlueClaws
 Reading Fightin Phils
 Wilmington Blue Rocks
 National Football League (NFL)
 Philadelphia Eagles
 National Hockey League (NHL)
 Philadelphia Flyers
 Major League Soccer (MLS)
 Philadelphia Union
 NBA G League
 Delaware Blue Coats
 National Lacrosse League (NLL)
 Philadelphia Wings

Media

The two main newspapers are The Philadelphia Inquirer and the Philadelphia Daily News, owned by the Philadelphia Media Network. Local television channels include KYW-TV 3 (CBS), WPVI 6 (ABC), WCAU 10 (NBC), WHYY-TV 12 (PBS), WPHL-TV 17 (MyNetworkTV), WTXF 29 (FOX), WPSG 57 (CW), and WPPX 61 (Ion). Radio stations serving the area include: WRTI, WIOQ, WDAS (AM), and WTEL.

Area codes
 215/267/445: The City of Philadelphia and some of its northern suburbs
 610/484: Southeastern Pennsylvania outside Philadelphia, including the western suburbs, the Lehigh Valley, and most of Berks County
 856: Southwestern New Jersey, including Camden, Cherry Hill, and Vineland
 609/640: Central and Southeastern New Jersey, including Trenton, Atlantic City and the southern Jersey Shore
 302: Delaware
 410/443/667: Eastern half of Maryland, including Cecil County
 717: South Central Pennsylvania, including Western Berks County

Politics

Philadelphia is heavily Democratic, having voted for the Democratic candidate in every presidential election since 1936. The surrounding suburban counties are key political areas in Pennsylvania, which itself is an important swing state in federal politics. South Jersey has consistently voted Democratic at the presidential level in recent years, although the region is slightly more Republican-leaning than North Jersey and has voted for Republicans at the state and local level. New Castle County's Democratic lean and large share of Delaware's population has tended to make Delaware as a whole vote for Democrats, while the less populous Kent County is more competitive. Recent well-known political figures from the Greater Philadelphia area include current U.S. President Joe Biden, former Pennsylvania Governor Ed Rendell and late former U.S. Senator Arlen Specter.

Congressional districts
The following congressional districts of the United States House of Representatives are located partly or entirely in the Delaware Valley CSA. Italicized counties are not part of the CSA.

Additionally, the Delaware Valley is represented in the United States Senate by the eight Senators from Delaware, Maryland, New Jersey, and Pennsylvania.

See also

 Central Delaware Valley AVA
 Delaware Valley Railway
 Northeast megalopolis
 Mid-Atlantic states

Notes

References

Further reading
 Jean R. Soderlund, Lenape Country: Delaware Valley Society before William Penn. Philadelphia: University of Pennsylvania Press, 2014.
 Mark L. Thompson, The Contest for the Delaware Valley: Allegiance, Identity, and Empire in the Seventeenth Century. Baton Rouge, LA: Louisiana State University Press, 2013.

External links

 Delaware Valley Regional Planning Commission
 Delaware River Basin Commission

 
Metropolitan areas of Delaware
Metropolitan areas of Maryland
Metropolitan areas of New Jersey
Metropolitan areas of Pennsylvania
Mid-Atlantic states
Northeast megalopolis
Regions of Pennsylvania
Regions of New Jersey
Regions of Maryland
Tourism regions of New Jersey